Jeff Wayne's Musical Version of The War of the Worlds – The New Generation is a 2012 concept album by Jeff Wayne and is a re-working of his 1978 concept album, retelling the story of the 1898 novel The War of the Worlds by H. G. Wells. As previously, the music format is predominantly progressive rock and string orchestra, but with synthesizers playing a more prominent role. The music is intermixed with re-voiced narration and leitmotifs to carry the story forward via rhyming melodic lyrics that express the feelings of the various characters. Due to the consistent popularity of the original album, Wayne decided to return to his score and re-create it for a new generation of audiences, as well as re-launch a live tour throughout the United Kingdom and Europe.

Background

Album
On 18 November 2011, Jeff Wayne announced at a press conference in London that there was to be a new release of his musical version of H. G. Wells 1898 novel, titled Jeff Wayne's Musical Version of The War of the Worlds – The New Generation. As the original musical version has remained one of the biggest selling albums of all time, Wayne explained that the idea was to return to it and explore H. G. Wells' characters in more detail, as well as develop the love story between the story's main character, George Herbert (the Journalist), and his fiancée Carrie. Wayne also explained that it would allow him to re-interpret his compositions with the new production techniques of today. The album was released on 26 November 2012 on both CD and Vinyl.

The New Generation features Academy Award nominated actor Liam Neeson as the Narrator, formerly played by Richard Burton. Neeson revealed he was impressed and intimidated by the prospect of narrating and starring in Wayne's project. Gary Barlow (lead singer and songwriter of the British vocal pop group Take That) is the Sung Thoughts of the Journalist, formerly voiced by Justin Hayward. British singer-songwriter Alex Clare is the Voice of Humanity. Maverick Sabre, Irish-English singer-songwriter and rapper, appears on the album as Parson Nathaniel, and English soul singer, songwriter, and actress Joss Stone is his wife Beth. Kaiser Chiefs front man Ricky Wilson took on the role of the Artilleryman. The Black Smoke Band once again includes Bassist Herbie Flowers and Guitarist Chris Spedding, both from the original 1978 album and its original 2006 tour.

Throughout mid to late 2012, tracks from The New Generation were released through various radio shows, which included all the guest artists tracks and a premier of "The Eve of the War". The new Liam Neeson hologram planned for the tour was demonstrated at the press conference with Neeson and Wayne and was also shown on The Alan Titchmarsh Show, on which an "Eve of the War" and "Forever Autumn" medley was performed with Wayne conducting. In January 2013, a music video was released for the song "Forever Autumn", performed by Gary Barlow, however Barlow does not appear in the video. It stars Jeff Wayne's daughter Anna-Marie Wayne as Carrie and Neeson as the Journalist and looks further into the story of Carrie, rather than from the Journalist's point of view as heard on the album. It features both all new footage as well as footage seen on the CGI 100-foot wide screen used during the live shows. The New Generation album was produced by Jeff Wayne and Damian Collier and was recorded at Olliewood Recording Studios in Hertfordshire by Gaetan Schurrer and Tom Woodstock.

Tours

2012-2013 The New Generation: Alive on Stage tour

A live tour based on the album began on 29 November 2012 and began playing across the UK and Europe. The live show, titled Jeff Wayne's Musical Version of The War of the Worlds – The New Generation: Alive on Stage!, includes a holographic performance of Liam Neeson, interacting with the other performers. Ricky Wilson retains his role as the Artilleryman from the album version. Marti Pellow (lead singer of the Scottish pop group Wet Wet Wet) is the Sung Thoughts of the Journalist. British rock band Jettblack's lead vocalist Will Stapleton is the Voice of Humanity. The touring cast includes Jason Donovan (who previously played the Artilleryman on tour) as Parson Nathaniel and West End theatre star Kerry Ellis as Beth. Michael Falzon and Lily Osborne appear as new characters William Rowland and Vera May respectively, appearing in a new prologue that segues into a re-animated version of the Martians' preparations for their invasion of Earth, introduced to the tour in 2009. Falzon also plays the small role of NASA controller Jerome Marvin Krauth (voiced by Jerry Wayne, recorded for the original 1978 album) in the Epilogue Part 2, in which he gets blasted by the fighting machine onstage behind him (the original version of Epilogue Part 2 had an abrupt ending) which concludes the show.

Alive on Stage! also includes other new content not featured on The New Generation album, such as a new scene opening Act II between The Journalist (Liam Neeson) and Carrie, his fiancée (Anna-Marie Wayne). This new piece, entitled "Distant Shores", is an exchange between the two after they have been separated and is seen onstage via holographic projections of both characters in which they express hope they may one day see each other again, speaking as though to each other, from distant shores. The show also includes effects used previously on tours including the use of pyrotechnics, now much improved, in which the audience is blasted by real heat rays, leaves fall upon the audience during "Forever Autumn", and a levitation effect is used after Beth is killed during the Spirit of Man.

Bassist Herbie Flowers and Guitarist Chris Spedding, both part of the original 1978 album and later the original 2006 live tour, again tour as members of The Black Smoke Band for Alive on Stage The rest of band remain relatively unchanged from the album and previous tours, with the exception of Gordy Marshall from the album is replaced by Accy Yeats on drums. Jeff Wayne conducts The Black Smoke Band and the ULLAdubULLA Strings as he has done on tours before. On 15 December Michael Falzon announced on Facebook, as did Kerry Ellis and Will Stapleton on Twitter, that the sold-out show at the O2 Arena in London was to be filmed for DVD release, distributed by Universal; this was confirmed by the official website. The DVD film was later shown on Universal's The Shows Must Go On! YouTube channel on 23 October 2020 and was available for that weekend. This release was dedicated to Falzon, who died on 23 June 2020 from germ cell cancer, and included link to a donation page for the Chris O'Brien Lifehouse where he was treated.

2012-2013 The New Generation: Alive on Stage tour dates

2014 The Final Arena tour 
In November 2013, it was confirmed that Jeff Wayne's Musical Version of The War of the Worlds – The New Generation would tour arenas again in late November through December 2014 for The Final Arena tour. Tickets went on sale 22 November 2013. The tour took place across the UK and the Netherlands, beginning in Sheffield on 27 November 2014 and coming to a close on 16 December 2014 in Amsterdam. Three of the guest performers were confirmed at the time of the tour announcement. Westlife's Brian McFadden played the role of the Sung Thoughts of the Journalist (played by Martin on the previous tour), Les Misérables' Carrie Hope Fletcher played Beth (played by Kerry Ellis on the 2012 tour), and Jason Donovan reprised his role of Parson Nathaniel. At the time, Jeff Wayne also announced that another guest had been confirmed but was yet to be announced. Later announcements confirmed Shayne Ward as the Artilleryman, Joseph Whelan as the Voice of Humanity, and Jonathan Vickers as the NASA Controller (voiced again by Jerry Wayne). Other changes included adding the character of Carrie's Father (actor Nigel Barber) and lyrics to the song "Life Begins Again".

Later in the year, the final guest was announced as actor Callum O'Neill, who portrayed H.G. Wells on stage in three separate stages of his life.
After the William Rowland and Vera May prologue was moved into a pre-show (with the characters performing among the audience rather than on stage), O'Neill appeared in a new prologue as a 33-year-old Wells, opening the show with a speech about 19th century England during the dying moments of 1899. He introduces himself and his work on The War of the Worlds before the on-screen introduction of the Martians. Later, just before Act II begins, O'Neill appears again as a 53-year-old Wells, discussing the end of World War I and speaking about the destructive capabilities of humankind. O'Neill appears a final time at the end of the show, just before the NASA epilogue, this time as a 79-year-old Wells, elderly and in a wheelchair. Set just after the end of World War II, he is dying, but now speaks about the extent of atrocities committed during the recent war, how human beings can, in some shapes and forms, be as destructive as the Martians had been in his novel.

The Final Arena tour ended on 16 December 2014 in Amsterdam. Speaking about the last show, Jeff Wayne said, "Bringing The War of the Worlds to life in many of the world's finest arenas has been the most amazing experience for me over the last seven years. We've achieved more than we ever thought was possible both musically and technologically. However, the time is right to take The War of the Worlds in new directions after the 2014 tour."

2014 The Final Arena tour dates

DVD and cinema
Alive on Stage! at the O2 Arena was recorded and released across cinemas in the UK and Europe in April 2013. The War of the Worlds team worked with the distribution company More2Screen, a company that brings special events to cinema. The recorded show was well received in a series of platform digital screenings in the UK before it transitioned to home entertainment; it was released on DVD in November 2013. DVD releases of The Final Arena and 40th Anniversary tours are unlikely to ever come to fruition.

2016 West End production 
It was announced that The War of the Worlds was to make its theatrical debut in a "re-imagined" West End production at the Dominion Theatre in London's West End, produced by Wayne and Bill Kenwright. It ran from 8 February to 30 April 2016 and featured direction by Bob Thompson, an onstage orchestra conducted by Jeff Wayne, and Liam Neeson as the Journalist in the usual 3D holography. Jimmy Nail played Parson Nathaniel, Daniel Bedingfield was The Artilleryman, and Heidi Range appeared as Beth. Alongside them was Michael Praed as George Herbert, Madalena Alberto playing Carrie, and singer-songwriter-producer David Essex as The Voice Of Humanity (Essex worked with Jeff Wayne even before he played the Artilleryman in the original 1978 album).
Due to the indisposition of Daniel Bedingfield during the run, the Artilleryman was played by understudy and West End performer Simon Shorten for a number of shows; later Shorten took over as the Artilleryman for the remaining month of the run. Several musical changes were made for the West End production including a key change for the song "Thunder Child", a new song written for the production titled "With Joy and Hope and Wonder", as well as a "Forever Autumn" duet at the beginning of Act II.

The 2016 West End production of Jeff Wayne's The War of The Worlds received mixed reviews.

2018 40th Anniversary tour 

In early 2018, Jeff Wayne announced that The War of The Worlds would be touring again with a special limited two month UK Tour celebrating the album's 40th anniversary. A new setup of staging, choreography, costumes, and cast of actors were introduced. Liam Neeson's narration and holography was once again used in the show. Newton Faulkner starred as the Sung Thoughts of the Journalist, Adam Garcia as the Artilleryman, Anna-Marie Wayne as Carrie, Inglorious''' Nathan James as The Voice of Humanity, Jason Donovan returned to play Parson Nathaniel, Carrie Hope Fletcher again as Beth, Lily Osborne reprised her role as Vera May, and Jonathan Vickers again played the NASA Controller. The new song for the 40th Anniversary tour, which was first seen in the 2016 West End production, was a reprise of "Forever Autumn". This was performed by both Anna-Marie Wayne and Newton Faulkner as their respective characters at the beginning of Act II.

The cast of players for the 40th Anniversary tour received critical acclaim, with many praising the acting, singing, and chemistry between Jason Donovan and Carrie Hope Fletcher during "The Spirit of Man". Nathan James' performance as the Voice of Humanity also received praise, and the inclusion of Anna-Marie Wayne as Carrie was also acclaimed.

 2018 40th Anniversary tour dates 

 The True Story of the Martian Invasion (cancelled 2021 tour) 

In March 2020, Jeff Wayne announced a new tour of The War of the Worlds for 2021 with new technological advances being added to the production. Liam Neeson's filmed footage would be used once again. The True Story of the Martian Invasion would journey across the UK as well as Amsterdam (for the first time since 2014) during March and April 2021. This would mark the 15th anniversary of the first War of the Worlds live tour, based on the 1978 album, which began in the UK and Ireland in April 2006. The press release announced "new features for the 2021 tour include the giant arched bridge now running from the lip of the stage out over the audience to the front of house desk" and "three panoramic screens with two hours of cutting edge CGI". The release touted the usual "big and bold lighting, pyrotechnics and other-worldly special effects, as well as a ground-breaking levitation effect". The release mentioned "the incineration of a cast member in full view of the audience" and "the release of deadly Black Smoke from the Martian Fighting Machine". The press release compared the planned 2021 tour to its original 2006 counterpart: "In 2006, TWOTW was already considered a cutting edge production with six trucks filled to the brim. But in 2021, which marks a momentous 15 years of live touring, the production is up to 12 trucks, and with it, a host of ingredients and special effects that will challenge and excite the senses."

By 10 September 2020, it was announced that The True Story of the Martian Invasion would be cancelled due to laws that were brought about by the COVID-19 pandemic prohibiting the number of individuals that could be present during indoor events.

 The Life Begins Again tour (2022 tour) 

On 10 September 2020, Jeff Wayne announced the Life Begins Again 2022 tour. The announcement discussed the postponement of its previously announced 2021 UK and European Tour. The Life Begins Again tour is named after an existing song within the Musical Version, a song about life returning to normal following the Martians' failure to foresee Earth's bacteria. "Now, mankind will look forward to life beginning again" said the press release.

The tour featured former Strictly Come Dancing dancer Kevin Clifton as the Artilleryman and Steps' Claire Richards as Beth. On 28 September 2021, the full cast was announced, including Duncan James as Parson Nathaniel, Nathan James again playing his role of The Voice of Humanity, Anna-Marie Wayne as Carrie; the Journalist's Fiancé, and, from the original 1978 album, Justin Hayward as The Sung Thoughts of the Journalist. Liam Neeson's holographic footage was once again used in the show. Callum O'Neill reprised his role from the 2014 Final Arena tour as H.G. Wells (although this time his performance was shown on screen, rather than live). Jonathan Vickers reprised his role as the NASA controller, and Stephanie Aves joined the company as Vera May.

 The Life Begins Again tour dates 

Critical receptionThe New Generation'' album received mixed to positive reactions from music critics and lifelong fans of Wayne's original album, with many praising Liam Neeson's performance as The Journalist, though some fans of the original were not impressed, comparing his performance to that of Richard Burton's. People praised its new compositions, dialogue and re-arrangement of Wayne's original music, claiming it to be "less dated", but criticism was aimed at the overuse of the synthesizer elements, as well as some of the singers' performances, mainly by some fans of the original album. Gary Barlow's performance of "Forever Autumn" received praise, but many criticized Ricky Wilson's performance as The Artilleryman, mainly for his delivery of the spoken dialogue. Maverick Sabre and Joss Stone's performances as Parson Nathaniel and Beth received a more lukewarm response whereas Alex Clare's rendition of "Thunder Child" received praise, with many people claiming that his take on the song was the best track on the album.

Since the album was released, Wayne has tried to be more faithful to his original version by toning down the synthesizer elements and re-arranging the string orchestra when he performed the album live in 2014 and 2018, but keeping his new compositions and Liam Neeson's narration entirely unchanged.

Track listing
All dialogue written by Doreen and Jeff Wayne's father Jerry Wayne, based upon H.G. Wells's original text.

Cast

Performers

The Black Smoke Band

Album
 Jeff Wayne – composer, arranger, keyboards, synthesizers
 Chris Spedding – electric guitar, acoustic guitar
 Herbie Flowers – bass guitar
 Ken Freeman – keyboards, synthesisers
 George Fenton – santoor, zither, tar
 Gordy Marshall – drums
 Ray Cooper – percussion
 Jo Partridge – guitars (The Heat Ray), vocals ('Ulla's)
 Tom Woodstock – guitars (The Heat Ray), additional keyboards, backing vocals, dulcimer
 Laurie Wisefield – mandolin, guitars, dulcimer
 Gaetan Schurrer – programming, keyboards, additional drum production

Tours
 Jeff Wayne – composer, conductor
 Chris Spedding – electric guitar, acoustic guitar
 Herbie Flowers – bass guitar
 Tom Woodstock – guitars, keyboards, backing vocals
 Laurie Wisefield – guitars, mandolin, autoharp, tar
 Huw Davies – guitars, mandolin, autoharp, tar, voice box (Farewell Thunder Child tour)
 Accy Yeats – drums
 Julia Thornton – percussion, harp, keyboards
 Olivia Jageurs – percussion, harp (Farewell Thunder Child tour)
 Steve Turner – keyboards
 Neil Angilley – keyboards
 Kennedy Aitchison – keyboards
 Thomas Gandey – keyboards (Farewell Thunder Child tour)

String Orchestra

Album
 Littlechap Strings

Tours
 ULLAdubULLA

Charts

Certifications

References

External links
 Official website
 Official Facebook page
 Jeff Wayne's Musical Version of The War of the Worlds – The New Generation: Alive On Stage! Complete recording (The Final Arena tour, Amsterdam 2014)

2012 albums
Alien invasions in music
Sony Music albums
Science fiction concept albums
Jeff Wayne albums
Works based on The War of the Worlds
Rock musicals
Rock operas
Music based on novels
Music based on science fiction works
Science fiction musicals